The Independent Alliance Party was a political party in the Canadian territory of Yukon that split from the Yukon Party in June 1991. The two original members were Bea Firth and Alan Nordling, both former members of the Yukon Party (the successor to the Yukon Progressive Conservative Party).

Both members were elected as independents in the 1992 election, as no Independent Alliance candidates were nominated before the election, but the alliance quickly crumbled. Nordling rejoined the Yukon Party for the 1996 election and the party lost its registration under the Elections Act 1999.

References 
 Cancer claims former Yukon cabinet minister - Whitehorse Daily Star
 Elections Yukon results page

Defunct political parties in Canada
Territorial political parties in Yukon
Political parties established in 1991
Political parties disestablished in 1999
1991 establishments in Yukon
1999 disestablishments in Canada